The pearly antshrike (Megastictus margaritatus) is a species of bird in the family Thamnophilidae. It is monotypic within the genus Megastictus. It is found in Brazil, Colombia, Ecuador, Peru, and Venezuela, where its natural habitat is subtropical or tropical moist lowland forests.

The pearly antshrike was described by the English zoologist Philip Sclater in 1855 and given the binomial name Myrmeciza margaritatus. The genus Megastictus was erected by the American ornithologist Robert Ridgway in 1909.

References

Thamnophilidae
Birds of the Amazon Basin
Birds described in 1855
Taxa named by Philip Sclater]
Taxonomy articles created by Polbot